Saint-Bon-Tarentaise is a former commune in the Savoie department in the Auvergne-Rhône-Alpes region in south-eastern France. On 1 January 2017, it was merged into the new commune Courchevel.

As well as Saint-Bon-Tarentaise itself, the commune also included the four villages (Le Praz-Courchevel 1300, Courchevel 1550, Moriond-Courchevel 1650 and Courchevel 1850) that together make up the ski resort of Courchevel.

See also
Communes of the Savoie department

References

Former communes of Savoie